Chak No 100 ML is a village situated in Union Council 98 ML, Karor Lal Esan Tehsil, Layyah District, Punjab, Pakistan.
It is bounded on the north by Chak No. 99 ML, on the east by Chak No. 114 ML on the south by Chak No. 255 TDA and Chak No 101 ML on the west. Tarkhani Disty Canal flows on its eastern side while a Winhar Canal (tail) takes a round about rest of the village.

Climate and general soil conditions 

Village has an extremely hot climate. The temperature in winter is low due to nearness to koh-Suleman range of mountains. An average is 40 °C in the summer and 10 °C in the winter. The land is comparatively better developed agriculturally as compared to other areas of the district of Layyah.

References 

Villages in Layyah District